Robert McGhee ( – 1893) was an Ontario farmer and politician. He represented Dufferin in the Legislative Assembly of Ontario as a Conservative member from 1883 to 1886.

McGhee came to Melancthon Township in Dufferin County in 1848. He served as reeve of Melancthon from 1865 to 1879 and again from 1891 until his death in the early summer of 1893.

His daughter Isabella married Manitoba politician Edward August.

References

External links

1830s births
1893 deaths
Progressive Conservative Party of Ontario MPPs